Shasqi is a biotechnology company based in San Francisco, California. The company is known for developing click chemistry-based therapies to treat cancer. Their targeting approach  is designed to activate powerful cancer therapies at the desired location in the body (e.g. the tumor), thereby minimizing  side effects of powerful cancer treatments. Shasqi is the first to use click chemistry in humans.

History 
Shasqi was founded in 2015 after participating in Y Combinator’s  program. The company was named after the shasqi, or chasqui, runners that distributed messages and goods across the Inca empire by running the Inca trails. The need for Shasqi's mission came from the realization that only 1%–2% of the total dose of medicine given to a patient reaches its desired target in the body. José M. Mejía Oneto wondered if there was a better way to tell drugs where to go in the body. Mejia Oneto started exploring click chemistry for this purpose, met Carolyn Bertozzi at a research conference in 2014 and decided to launch the company.

Shasqi has been collaborating with the Royzen Lab at the University at Albany on research using click chemistry for sarcoma treatments since 2016. In 2017, Mejía Oneto recruited Sebastian Sanchez de Lozada to help him run Shasqi. The two had met as roommates while studying at Macalester College. Shasqi has received multiple SBIR Phase II grants from the National Science Foundation in 2017 and from the National Institutes of Health.

Shasqi began focusing exclusively on oncology in 2018. The company developed a platform known as CAPAC (Click Activated Protodrugs Against Cancer), which is designed to localize  cancer therapies at the tumor. The platform’s lead asset, SQ3370, is recorded as the first use of click chemistry in the human body. This investigational product enables the activation of a chemotherapy medication, Doxorubicin, at the tumor site while reducing systemic side effects. The CAPAC technology uses the tetrazine ligation to localize cancer therapies at the tumor site.

Phase 1 of the SQ3370 clinical trial using the company’s CAPAC technology, began in 2019. Shasqi has presented interim Phase 1 results for SQ3370 in advanced solid tumors showing the total dose of doxorubicin administered to the tumor site was 12 times the conventional dose, without the myelosuppression and cardiac toxicity expected from those dose levels. Shasqi advanced the SQ3370 program to a Phase 2 clinical trial in 2022 testing the safety and efficacy of SQ3370 in patients with solid tumors who have never received a dose of doxorubicin.

The CAPAC technology is designed to enhance chemotherapies, as well as other cancer therapies, like antibody-drug conjugates. 

Shasqi was one of the companies that participated in the JPM20 healthcare conference.

In October 2022, Shasqi Scientific Advisor Carolyn Bertozzi won the Nobel Prize for Chemistry for bioorthogonal chemistry the concept on which the company’s technology is based.

References 

2015 establishments in California
Biotechnology companies established in 2015
Biotechnology companies of the United States